Roland Prout (1 March 1920 – 24 April 1997) was a British sprint canoer who competed in the early 1950s. He was eliminated in the heats of the K-2 1000 m event at the 1952 Summer Olympics in Helsinki.

Together with his brother Francis Prout, in the family firm of G. Prout & Sons (founded in 1935 by their father, Geoffrey Prout), he developed the pioneering Shearwater III racing catamaran in 1956 and several later designs.

References

External links
Roland Prout's profile at Sports Reference.com

1920 births
1997 deaths
Canoeists at the 1952 Summer Olympics
Olympic canoeists of Great Britain
British male canoeists
British yacht designers